Andrew James MacKay (born 27 August 1949) is a British Conservative Party politician who served as the Member of Parliament (MP) for Birmingham Stechford from 1977 to 1979, East Berkshire from 1983 to 1997 and for Bracknell in Berkshire from 1997 to 2010.

Early life
MacKay attended Solihull School, an independent school in Solihull, West Midlands. After leaving school he chaired the Solihull Young Conservatives. He has worked as a car salesman, estate agent and company director.

Parliamentary career
MacKay first entered parliament in 1977, after taking Birmingham Stechford from Labour at the Birmingham Stechford by-election. He lost the seat at the 1979 general election, but re-entered parliament in 1983 as MP for East Berkshire. He was deputy Chief Whip under John Major, and was Shadow Secretary of State for Northern Ireland from 1997 to September 2001 during the leadership of William Hague. He was on the backbenches subsequently, but was appointed a Conservative Deputy Chairman in September 2004 with responsibility for candidates, and, after David Cameron's election in November 2005 as Leader of the Conservative Party, MacKay became a Senior Parliamentary/Political Adviser to the new Conservative leader.

Expenses claims

MacKay and Kirkbride own two homes: one in her constituency; and a flat close to Parliament in Westminster. In a case of so-called "double-dipping," according to The Daily Telegraph, MacKay had used his Additional Costs Allowance to claim more than £1,000 a month in mortgage interest payments on their joint Westminster flat. His wife used her Additional Costs Allowance to claim over £900 a month on paying off the mortgage for their family home near her constituency. This means they effectively had no main home but two second homes – and were using public funds to pay for both of them. During 2008–9, MacKay claimed a total of £23,083 under Additional Costs Allowance, while Kirkbride claimed £22,575. They also claimed for each other's travel costs, with Kirkbride claiming £1,392 to meet spouse travel, while MacKay claimed £408. On 14 May 2009, he resigned from his position as parliamentary aide to Cameron in the wake of the furore over Parliamentary expenses after what was described as an "unacceptable" expenses claim.

At a public meeting in his constituency on 22 May he had been heckled, and called a "thieving toad" according to The Independent.

In an interview with Matthew Amroliwala on BBC News the following morning, MacKay apologised for his error of judgement. In what he claimed was an agreed procedure with the Parliamentary Claims office, he had designated their Westminster home as his secondary home, while Kirkbride has designated the Bromsgrove house as her second home. MacKay announced that the procedure had been ongoing for eight or nine years, and that he would be repaying the monies after taking advice from the Conservatives scrutiny committee.

On 23 May 2009, after a telephone call from Cameron, it was announced that MacKay would stand down at the 2010 general election.

Personal life
In 1974 MacKay married Diana Joy Kinchin; they had two children, but divorced in 1996. The following year, MacKay married Julie Kirkbride, a fellow Conservative MP; the couple have a son who attended Westminster School.

References

External links
 Andrew MacKay official site
 ePolitix.com - Andrew MacKay MP
 
 Guardian Unlimited Politics - Ask Aristotle: Andrew MacKay MP
 TheyWorkForYou.com - Andrew MacKay MP
 The Public Whip - Andrew MacKay MP voting record
 BBC News - Andrew MacKay MP BBC profile

Audio clips
 Shadow Northern Ireland minister in 1999
 Decommissioning of weapons in 2001

1949 births
Living people
People from Birmingham, West Midlands
People from Bracknell
People educated at Solihull School
Conservative Party (UK) MPs for English constituencies
Members of the Privy Council of the United Kingdom
UK MPs 1974–1979
UK MPs 1983–1987
UK MPs 1987–1992
UK MPs 1992–1997
UK MPs 1997–2001
UK MPs 2001–2005
UK MPs 2005–2010
Treasurers of the Household
Spouses of British politicians